Hydrofluoroethers (HFE) are a class of organic solvents. As non-ozone-depleting chemicals, they were developed originally as a replacement for CFCs, HFCs, HCFCs, and PFCs. They are typically colorless, odorless, tasteless, low toxicity, low viscosity, and liquid at room temperature. The boiling point of HFEs vary from 50 °C to nearly 100 °C. Although 3M first developed HFEs, other manufacturers have begun producing them.

Applications
Industrial uses are many and varied, including:
 Vapor de-greasing solvent
 Refrigerant and heat-transfer fluid
 Anhydrous fluid cleaner
They are sometimes applied as blends such as HFE 7100, which is a mixture of methyl nonafluorobutyl ether (methoxyperfluorobutane) and methyl nonfluoroisobutyl ether.

3M produce Hydrofluoroether compounds under the name Novec 7000, 7100, 7200, 7300, 7500, and 7700 as liquid coolant for many applications including Full immersion cooling of computer electronics

Environmental Impact
Due to high molecular weights, HFEs remain in the atmosphere for less than two weeks, being absorbed into the ground rather than remaining dissolved in the atmosphere. Although HFEs are greenhouse gases, the EPA does not regulate their use due to the short atmospheric lifetimes and zero ozone depletion potential compared to alternative chemicals.

See also
Immersion cooling
Liquid dielectric
Novec 649 and 774
Fluorinert

External links
Heat transfer applications using 3M Novec Engineered Fluids

References

Coolants
Ethers
Liquid dielectrics
Organofluorides